The tinkling cisticola or grey cisticola (Cisticola rufilatus) is a species of bird in the family Cisticolidae. It is found in Angola, Botswana, Republic of the Congo, Democratic Republic of the Congo, Gabon, Malawi, Namibia, South Africa, Zambia, and Zimbabwe. It's natural habitat is dry savannah.

Note that the name tinkling cisticola is also used as an alternative name for Levaillant's cisticola (Cisticola tinniens).

References

External links
 Tinkling cisticola - Species text in The Atlas of Southern African Birds.

Cisticola
Taxonomy articles created by Polbot
Birds described in 1870